The Roman Catholic Diocese of El Tigre is a diocese located in the city of El Tigre in the Ecclesiastical province of Cumaná in Venezuela.

The diocese covers an area of the some part of the Anzoátegui State. It's divided into 14 parishes, having 13 priests and 6 seminarians all together.

History
On May 31, 2018, Pope Francis established the Diocese of El Tigre, when it was split off from the Diocese of Barcelona in Venezuela.

Ordinaries
José Manuel Romero Barrios (since 31 May 2018)

See also
Roman Catholicism in Venezuela

References

External links
 Profile at the Catholic Hierarchy

Roman Catholic dioceses in Venezuela
Roman Catholic Ecclesiastical Province of Cumaná
Christian organizations established in 2018
Roman Catholic dioceses and prelatures established in the 21st century
2018 establishments in Venezuela